Gerino Gerini (10 August 1928 – 17 April 2013) was a racing driver from Italy.

A native of Rome, he participated in seven World Championship Formula One Grands Prix, debuting on 22 January 1956.  He scored 1.5 championship points. He also participated in numerous non-Championship Formula One races, as well as sports cars in both Ferraris and Maseratis.

Complete Formula One World Championship results
(key)

''* Indicates shared drive with Chico Landi

References

External links
Profile at www.statsf1.com

1928 births
2013 deaths
Racing drivers from Rome
Italian racing drivers
Italian Formula One drivers
Maserati Formula One drivers
Scuderia Centro Sud Formula One drivers
World Sportscar Championship drivers